Marie Elisabeth of Brunswick-Wolfenbüttel (7 January 1638 - 15 February 1687), was a German noblewoman of the House of Welf and by her two marriages Duchess of Saxe-Eisenach and Saxe-Coburg.

Born in Brunswick, she was the second of the three children of Augustus the Younger, Duke of Brunswick-Lüneburg and his third wife, Duchess Elisabeth Sophie of Mecklenburg. Marie Elisabeth and her older brother Ferdinand Albert are the only surviving children of their parents' marriage. In addition, they had seven older half-siblings from Duke Augustus' two previous marriages, of whom only four survive adulthood: Rudolph Augustus, Sibylle Ursula (by marriage Duchess of Holstein-Glücksburg), Clara Augusta (by marriage Duchess of Württemberg-Neustadt) and Anthony Ulrich, all born from Augustus' second marriage with Dorothea of Anhalt-Zerbst.

Life
In Wolfenbüttel on 18 January 1663, Marie Elisabeth married firstly Adolf William, Duke of Saxe-Eisenach. They had five sons:
 Karl August, Hereditary Prince of Saxe-Eisenach (Eisenach, 31 January 1664 - Eisenach, 14 February 1665).
 Frederick William, Hereditary Prince of Saxe-Eisenach (Eisenach, 2 February 1665 - Eisenach, 3 May 1665).
 Adolf William, Hereditary Prince of Saxe-Eisenach (Eisenach, 26 June 1666 - Eisenach, 11 December 1666).
 Ernest August, Hereditary Prince of Saxe-Eisenach (Eisenach, 28 August 1667 - Eisenach, 8 February 1668).
 William August, Duke of Saxe-Eisenach (Eisenach, 30 November 1668 - Eisenach, 23 February 1671).

Duke Adolf William died on 21 November 1668, leaving his widow heavily pregnant with their fifth and last child. Nine days later, William August was born and became Duke of Saxe-Eisenach from the moment of his birth, under the guardianship of his uncle John George; however, being a sickly child like all his four older brothers, died aged 2, and Saxe-Eisenach passed to John George.

In Gotha on 18 July 1676, Marie Elisabeth married secondly Albert, co-Duke of Saxe-Gotha-Altenburg with his brothers; after their marriage, the couple settled in Saalfeld, who was designed as Albert's residence. They had one son:

 Ernest August (Saalfeld, 1 September 1677 – Saalfeld, 17 August 1678).

After concluding a definitive treaty of partition with his brothers, in 1680 Albert received Coburg, where he and Marie Elisabeth moved their residence.

Marie Elisabeth died in Coburg, aged 49, having survived all her sons. Her widower remarried morganatically one year later and died childless in 1699.

Notes

|-

|-

New House of Brunswick
House of Wettin
1638 births
1687 deaths
17th-century German people
Duchesses of Saxe-Eisenach
Daughters of monarchs
Remarried royal consorts